is a passenger railway station located in the city of Kameoka, Kyoto Prefecture, Japan, operated by West Japan Railway Company (JR West).

Lines

Station layout
The station consists of two opposed side platforms connected to the station building by a footbridge. The station has a Midori no Madoguchi staffed ticket office.

Platforms

History
Namikawa Station opened on 20 July 1935. With the privatization of the Japan National Railways (JNR) on 1 April 1987, the station came under the aegis of the West Japan Railway Company. The current station building in 1989 when the station was relocated  to the north of its original location.

Station numbering was introduced in March 2018 with Namikawa being assigned station number JR-E12.

Passenger statistics
In fiscal 2019, the station was used by an average of 3257 passengers daily.

Surrounding area
 Kameoka Municipal Taisei Junior High School
 Kameoka City Oi Elementary School

See also
List of railway stations in Japan

References

External links

 Station Official Site

Railway stations in Kyoto Prefecture
Sanin Main Line
Railway stations in Japan opened in 1935
Kameoka, Kyoto